Doughton may refer to:

People
 Robert L. Doughton (1863–1954) North Carolina politician
 Rufus A. Doughton (1857–1946) North Carolina politician, brother of Robert
 Shannon Doughton, alias of musician Britt Walford

Places
 Doughton, Gloucestershire, England, hamlet, location of Highgrove House
 Doughton, Norfolk, England, hamlet